Ponto may refer to:

 Ponto District, one of  districts of the province Huari in Peru

See also 

 Ponte (disambiguation)
 Ponti (disambiguation)